is a Japanese tokusatsu television show. It was Toei's twentieth production of the Super Sentai metaseries. It is the second vehicle-themed Super Sentai, preceded by Kousoku Sentai Turboranger. It aired from March 1, 1996 to February 7, 1997, replacing Chouriki Sentai Ohranger and was replaced by Denji Sentai Megaranger. The show was written as a parody of its own franchise. Its action footage was used in Power Rangers Turbo.

On January 6, 2017, Amazon set to pre-order "Gekisou Sentai Carranger: The Complete Series" on Region 1 DVD by Shout! Factory and it was released in North America on April 25, 2017. This is the fifth Super Sentai series to be released in North America. In June 2018, Shout! streamed the series on their website.

Plot
Five workers from the Pegasus Auto Garage discover Dappu, an alien from planet Hazard. He empowers the five with the "Carmagic" power of the five legendary car constellations, transforming them into Carrangers. As Carrangers, the five battle an alien reckless driver gang and prevent them from destroying Earth.

Carrangers
The Carrangers consist of five employees at the  auto garage and use  to fight the Bowzock. Advertisements for the series show that the first kana in the Carrangers' names spell  in Japanese.

Kyosuke Jinnai 
 is 23 years old. He is a test driver at the Pegasus Auto Garage, normally only assigned to do errands and aberrant jobs. Kyosuke was pristinely a selfish jerk, callous enough to abandon his team because he wanted to drive his authoritative figure's classic car. Soon, though, Kyosuke realized that he had a responsibility as the Carranger's bellwether and became very conscientious, albeit the role of bellwether sometimes gets to him and he is inundated by the stress of being responsible for the team. He fell in love with Zonnette, albeit at first she only loves his Red Racer alter ego, and is eventually able to confess his love to her. He is a very stouthearted, heroic man who was disposed to jeopardize his life to fight as Kyousuke and not Red Racer to prove his love for Zonnette.

Kyosuke Jinnai is portrayed by Yūji Kishi.

Naoki Domon 
 is 17 years old (though he turns 18 during the series – he had his day of inception party early on in the series, but his partners unknowingly missed the date by a month) and very polite and shy. He works as a car designer at Pegasus Garage, and his aptitude had led him to be sought by car manufacturers before. Naoki is withal an animal lover.

Naoki Domon is portrayed by Yoshihiro Masujima.

Minoru Uesugi 
 is the oldest of the team, 24 years old, and a bungling salesman at Pegasus. He once loses the bracelet portion of the Accel Changer (and thus the Green Racer powers) while practicing victory poses after a fight in episode 8. Minoru verbalizes with Osaka-ben and is a fan of the Hanshin Tigers.

Minoru Uesugi is portrayed by Yoshihiro Fukuda.

Natsumi Shinohara 
 is 19 years old. A genius mechanic at Pegasus Garage, Natsumi is able to fine-tune any machine in minutes. She uses a legendary wrench given to her by the owner of a garage she visited as a child, but later learns she can still fine-tune anything without the wrench. Her initial opposition to Kyosuke's relationship with Zonnette makes her one of two female warriors to oppose the red warrior.

Natsumi Shinohara is portrayed by Yuka Motohashi.

Youko Yagami 
 is 19 years old. She is the secretary at Pegasus Garage, calculating the expenses and payroll. Yoko is very self-conscious about her weight because she loves to eat sweets, and frequently consults magazine fortune-telling articles to prognosticate her future. She dreams of becoming an idol someday and espousing an affluent husband, and has a terrible sense of direction.

Youko Yagami is portrayed by Atsuko Kurusu.

Allies

Signalman 
 is a robotic being who was assigned to Earth, and something of a Sixth Ranger figure. He emanates from the Police Planet, where he left behind his wife Sigue, and son Sigtarou. To Gynamo, Signalman was space's number one worst person. He can sometimes be more of an obstruction than a help to the Carrangers, because of his excruciating training in the rules of traffic. Signalman briefly left Earth and returned to his homeworld to spend time with his family only to find that it was polluted by five-colored exhaust engendered by Exhaus to warp Signalman's mind. Apostatized that the Carrangers were behind it, he went back to Earth to perform police brutality on them, and remotely became the new bellwether of the Bowzock. Fortunately, the Carrangers managed to restore their friend to normal by chicaning him into imbibing natural mineral dihydrogen monoxide. Signalman kenned off the Carrangers true identities until episode 46 through Ichitarou.

Before entering battle, he verbalizes, "Upholding the traffic rules of justice! My name is...Signalman!" In the finale, Signalman returns to be with his family.

Signalman is voiced by Hōchū Ōtsuka.

Dapp 
 is one of the few survivors of planet Hazard, which was destroyed by the Bowzock after they ransacked it for its treasures, he took his mother's pendant as her final wish to find the Carrangers. Stalling away on the Barbariban, Dappu arrives to Earth to find the Carrangers-to-be. But when they refused to fight for frivolous reasons, Dappu fights Zelmonda himself and fakes being killed to give the gang incentive to fight. He is the keeper of the 'Kurumagic' (a pun on Kuruma (car) and Magic), thus the Carrangers' power is dependent on their friendship with him. Through about episode 18, he wore a cloak, until the events of that episode forced him into Earth-style clothes.

Dapp is voiced by Mari Maruta.

Tenma Family
The  is the family involved in the Carrangers' lives. The father is the owner of the Pegasus Garage where the gang works, and his son befriended Signalman.

Souichirou Tenma 
 is the owner of the Pegasus Garage and the boss of the five members of the Gekisou Sentai Carranger team. He is an automobile aficionado and always drives his prized vehicles to work, much to the envy of other car lovers such as Kyousuke Jinnai. He and his family are fans of the Carranger (even though he does not know they are his workers) and finds himself at the mercy upon occasion both at the actions of the Bowzock as well as Dapp, who is using one of the garage's rooms as the team's headquarters in secret.

Souichirou Tenma is portrayed by Ed Yamaguchi.

Yoshie Tenma 
 is Souichirou's wife.

Ichitarou Tenma 
 is Souichirou and Yoshie's son, who is close friends with Signalman. Though a young boy, he is a friend and ally with the Carrangers and has frequent encounters with the Sentai team as well as other factions running amok on Earth. Notably, he is the one who originally suggested to Inventor Grotch various food that was popular on Earth, in particular the imo-youkan that would lead to the Bowzock discovering a method of growing large to destroy Earth (though originally suggested by his father). He also once protected Signalman's police box while the alien officer was on duty.

Ichitarou Tenma is portrayed by Ryuji Teraoka.

Radietta Fanbelt 
is the younger sister of Zonnette, and a huge Carranger fan. With magic, she dons an outfit modeled after the Carrangers (to the point of having the number six as an identifier) and calls herself "White Racer". Before entering battle, she says "Dreamy traffic safety! Racing Girl, White Racer!". She drives the Radiacar which can become a robot, but for only one minute. First aided Carrangers against the Zokurangers, able to shapeshift. Calls Red Racer "big brother" because of his love for Zonnette. Transforms by saying "Tiramisu, konjac, mille-feuille". She uses , volleyball-sized explosives that detonate if the enemy who catches it does not know the answer to White Racer's riddles.

Radietta Fanbelt is portrayed by Megumi Hamamatsu in episode 25 and Misaki Sudō in later episodes.

VRV Master 
He is a being in black armor who appeared suddenly while Dapp was in the hibernation that his race goes into. He gave the Carrangers the VRV Machines after the RV Robo had been stolen by Bowzock. It was later revealed that the VRV Master was Dapp's father. To save his son from Exhaus he apparently sacrificed himself so he could return to Earth. Later, however, through a Christmas gift from him, revealed he was alive. He returned to Earth once again to save the Carrangers and Dapp from being killed in a bombing of their work/base. He was addicted to coffee milk, which was the reason why he wasn't in hibernation himself. After the final battle, VRV Master is finally seen out of his suit and travels in Victrailer (out in space) with Dapp.

VRV Master is portrayed by Kiyoshi Kobayashi.

Universal Reckless Driving Tribe Bowzock
The  is an intergalactic biker gang with no regard for the laws of traffic. Hired by Exhaus to pave the way for his highway by blowing up every planet in the way of construction. They have targeted Earth, the last of such planets, for destruction and frequently hang out at the BB Saloon, a bar in the Baribarian spacecraft. After he had absorbed the Carrangers' Carmagic Power, Exhaus set the Baribarian spacecraft on fire and sent it crashing to Earth, only to have it stopped by Sirender and the Carranger in human form take control of it and drove it straight into Exhaus to try and kill him. It didn't kill him, though it was destroyed.

The Bowzock members, as well as Signalman, mispronounce the Japanese word for "Earth", saying  (吃球) instead of the correct form  (地球). In Shout! Factory's release of the series, the name of "Earth" is changed to "Earsh".

Emperor Exhaus 
: The main antagonist of the series who hired the Bowzock to do his dirty work. His ultimate plan was to build a giant road for aliens across the Milky Way, and to destroy Earth because it was in the way of the road. Exhaus kidnapped Dapp and tried to drain his Carmagic Power to use for his own robots, turning it into Akumagic Power, but his plan backfired when Dappu overloaded the robots with power. He betrayed the Bowzock and took over the operation personally, only to fight the Carrangers personally when he absorbed the evil energies of the entire universe into his body to assume a fighting form, . In this form he seemed unbeatable, damaging both VRV Robo and RV Robo, but was fed stale imo-youkan by Gynamo, causing him to weaken, revert to his original form and shrink to human size so he could be finished off by the Carrangers.

Emperor Exhaus is voiced by Osamu Kobayashi.

Ritchhiker 
: An alien who Gynamo hired to help the Bowzock as their "Evil Director of Human Resources", devising the plans to deal with the Carrangers and Signalman, whom he had a grudge on from putting him in jail. However, during the Bowzock Matsuri festival, Ritchhicker is struck by a lightning bolt made of pure evil cosmic energy that turns him into . With his increased intellect, RitchRitchiker kicked out Gynamo and Zonette and takes over as leader of the Bowzock with the promises of riches to the space bikers. From there, RitchRitchiker uses Braking to steal RV Robo from the Carrangers before using his robot to take a building holding the Study Book Fair to educate his forces. But it leads to his robot's defeat by the VRV Machines with RitchRitchhiker upgrading Braking as he proceeds to capture VRV Master. However, it results in RitchRitchiker's death when is consumed in the blaze caused by Braking being finally destroyed by VRV Robo.

Ritchhicker is voiced by Nobuo Tanaka.

Gynamo 
: The leader of the Bowzock who is madly in love with Zonnette, targeting Earth on her whim. Though he makes an idiot of himself in front of his posse during his attempts to woo Zonnette, Gynamo maintained his intimidation of the other Bowzock to maintain his power. Arriving to Earth, Gynamo uses his power to have Earth's vehicles go on a riot until the Carrangers arrive. The next time Gynamo arrived on Earth was when RitchRitchiker used his secret savings for marrying Zonnette to buy off Zelmoda and Grotch, getting work at an arcade's Yakiniku stand. But upon learning of RitchRitchiker's death, Gynamo resumes his position as Bowzock leader. At the end of the series, he re-opened the yakiniku restaurant that he set up while Ritchiker took over the Bowzock.

Gynamo is voiced by Hiroshi Ōtake.

Zelmoda 
: Second-in-command of the Bowzock, and Gynamo's friend. Unlike comical other members, he is kind of cold-blooded as he only betrayed Gynamo after being offered a large sum of money by RitchRitchiker. His main weapon is a sword made up of playing cards and he carries an octopus jar, that usually holds Wumpers or cash. Zelmoda suffered astraphobia when he was screwing around during a thunderstorm as a kid and was hit by lightning. However, he mustered up enough will to overcome his fear so he can move out of Gynamo's shadow. Zelmoda summons Elekinta, who temporarily powered-up his ride. At the end of the series, he and Grotch help work at Gynamo's restaurant while going to elementary school for education.

Zelmoda is voiced by Kyōsei Tsukui.

Grotch 
: Bowzock's genius inventor, responsible for many of the weapons used by the Bowzock such as the Fattening Spray and Forgetfulness Water-Gun. Forced to flee to Earth for laughing at Gynamo's expense, a starved Grotch holds Ichirou hostage to force Yoshie to buy him lots of food. Among them was Imocho-brand imo-yōkan, causing him to enlarge as he unintentionally causes city-wide damage. He attempted to take advantage of his new size to kill the Carrangers, as their current arsenal has no effect. Fortunately, the imo-yōkan he ate had expired and wore off before either could do harm to the other. He is also saved by Zelmoda before the Carrangers could do him harm. After the incident with MM Mogu, Grotch would usually accompany a Gorotsuki to Earth and purchase Imocho-brand imo-yōkan. At the end of the series, he and Zelmoda helped work at Gynamo's restaurant while going to elementary school for education.

Grotch is voiced by Takashi Nagasako.

Zonnette 
: An obedient member of Bowzock who uses her feminine wiles, and Gynamo's crush on her, for her own selfish pleasures. Zonnette drives a pink convertible called the Zonnecar. Arriving with a bandaged up Wurin in the guise of "Zonko" (in episode 13), she tricks Signalman into thinking the Carrangers are lawbreakers. However, as her plan failed, Zonnette fell madly in love with Red Racer after seeing him in action. However, she loved only Red Racer and not Kyosuke, who unintentionally broke her heart during the GG Goki-chan incident. As time passed she also fell for the man behind the mask. She is Radietta's big sister and the princess of planet Fanbelt.

At the end of the series, she becomes "purified" and resumed her true form,  by saying "Ravioli, Kishimen, Linguini!", returning to her home planet for an arranged marriage, though she turns them all down since Red Racer is still in her heart. She returned during the finale and talked Gynamo into teaming up with the Carrangers, which they did.

Zonnette is portrayed by Rika Nanase.

Wumpers 
Combatant Wumpers (戦闘員ワンパー Sentōin Wanpā, 1–47) are the Bowzock's multi-colored henchmen, able to shoot ink from their octopus-like mouths. They are contained in Zelmoda's giant octopus jar, similar to that of aquatic pets. They come in many colors; green, blue, white, and pink. White tended to be rarer than others and were often the butt of a quick gag.

Zokurangers 
A short-lived parody of the Carrangers, the Boso Sentai Zokuranger (暴走戦隊ゾクレンジャー Bōsō Sentai Zokurenjā, 25) was founded by SS Pamaan. While they originally used the Zokuranger Ball, the Zokurangers obtain the Zokuren Bazooka and Zonnette's Fanbelt Crystal necklace to power it. But SS Pamaan is killed.

 SS Pamaan (スースーパマーン Sū Sū Pamān, 25): Bowzock's best hero researcher, armed with a two-laser hole gun and a sword similar to Red Racer. Pamaan is sent to Earth by Ritchhiker to study the Carrangers and defeat them. This leads Pamaan to create his personal Super Sentai team with four Gorotsuki: The Zokurangers. As the leader of the Zokurangers, calling himself "Zoku Red" (ゾクレッド "Zokkureddo"), Pamaan is caught off guard by Radiatta as he has his team fall back. After getting the Zokuren Bazooka, Pamaan kidnaps Radiatta to get an advantage on the Carrangers. Luckily, Radiatta uses her magic to assume Gyunamo's form to trick Paman in freeing her so the Carrangers can defeat his team. Though he enlarges after eating imo-youkan, Pamaan is destroyed while in the middle of declaring the name of his ultimate weapon's attack: ("Great Galaxy Blitzkrieg Science Darkness Sword: Lightning Blitzkrieg Plasma Cyber Aurora Centrifugal Gravity Super Thunder..." (大銀河電撃科学暗黒剣・稲妻電撃プラズマサイバーオーロラ遠心重力スーパーサンダー... Dai Ginga Dengeki Kagaku Ankoku Ken Inazuma Dengeki Purazuma Saibā Ōrora Enshin Jūryoku Sūpā Sandā...)).
 Zoku Blue (ゾクブルー Zokuburū): A gorilla/police officer-themed Gorotsuki who fought with Blue Racer. He fought with a butcher's knife hooked with a chain to a sickle and later wield two guns similar to Blue Racer's weapons.
 Zoku Green (ゾクグリーン Zokugurīn): A frog/fish/soldier Gorotsuki who fought with Green Racer. Originally, he was the bartender of BB Saloon. He first wielded an axe, and later fought with a musket-like cannon.
 Zoku Yellow (ゾクイエロー, Zokuierō): A turkey/vulture/aircraft pilot Gorotsuki who fought with Yellow Racer. He fought with a lance-like weapon, but later with two round knives similar to Yellow Racer's weapons.
 Zoku Pink (ゾクピンク, Zokupinku): A female white cat-themed Gorotsuki who fought with Pink Racer. She fought with a rake originally but later fought with a bow similar to pink racer. She and Zonnette were the only female regulars in the BB Saloon.

Evil Mecha

Braking 
Braking (ブレーキング Burakingu, 29-31): A giant robot dinosaur that RitchRichiker built after having a dream during his transition, using Gynamo's secret savings to construct the robot. After being defeated by the VRV Machines, Braking is upgraded into Modified Braking (改造ブレーキング Kaizo Burakingu, 31) with a new head equipped with the King Slugger crest. But Braking ends up being destroyed by the Carrangers after they form their new VRV Robo.

Norishiron 12 
Norishiron 12 (ノリシロン－12 Norishiron Touerubu, 37 & 38): A giant blue robot with bull horns, created from punch-out cardboard model by Grotch from a Space Land magazine brought by Exhaus. It was piloted by Zelmoda. Armed with chest cannons, Acceleration Device (for superspeed), and axe (Norishiron Reckless Dashing Slice). It nearly defeated Sirender and VRV Robo, but it lost an arm when Zelmoda departed without a crucial pin in place and it soon returned fully repaired. Later it was accidentally reverted into cardboard sheets from Chiipuri's youth cream. A second version Norishion Final (ノリシロンファイナル  Norishiron Fainaru, 46) was given by Exhaus that was piloted by Gynamo, Zelmoda, and Grotch and equipped with weapons similar to Victrailer's cannon arms for its Final Twister attack. It was intended to be used as a distraction so Exhaus could steal the power of the Carmagic constellations. Easily overpowered VRV Robo, until the Carrangers briefly break it apart to overpower Norishiron Final with the VRV Fighters, before reassembling and using Victory Twister to overpower their Final Twister and defeat it. Another version called Norishiron Extra (ノリシロン増刊 Norishiron Zōkan) was used in the Gekisou Sentai Carranger vs Ohranger special against the Ohranger and Carranger teams, but was destroyed by Sirender after Signalman arrived.

Sky Gigyoon 
Sky Gigyoon (スカイギギューン Sukai Gigyūn, 41-43): A red eagle-like robot issued by Exhaus. It was piloted by Zonnette in Radicar convertible in its fight battle, through Exhaus took control of it and used it to hold off VRV Robo so Grotch in Marine Zaboon could capture Dappu before having it retreat. It was remote controlled by Gynamo in its second run and was destroyed by RV Robo with the V Bazooka.

Marine Zaboon 
Marine Zaboon (マリンザブーン Marin Zabūn, 41-43): A blue shark-like robot issued by Exhaus. It was piloted by Grotch. First used to capture Dappu while Sky Gigyoon was keeping the Carranger busy. In its first underwater battle, it overpowered the VRV Robo due to the Carranger's loss of Carmagic, forcing them to retreat after Sirender arrived. When the Carranger later return with RV Robo, though it overpowers both it and Sirender, Signalman uses Sirender to hold it in place so the Carrangers could use the last of RV Robo's power for Plagnade Spark to blast Grotch out of the cockpit. For its final battle it was remote controlled by Gynamo. It was destroyed by VRV Robo with the V Vulcan.

Land Zuzoon 
Land Zuzoon (ランドズズーン Rando Zuzūn, 41-43): A golden lion-like robot issued by Exhaus, piloted by Gynamo, armed with Reckless Dash Claw. It used its tractor beam to capture Dappu, drained Dappu of his Carmagic Power, overpowering the VRV Fighters and Sirender. After Dappu causes an overload, it allows the Carranger mecha to regain their power. Destroyed by Carrangers using both RV Robo and VRV Robo for their RV Twister Cutter team attack, to attack the head and legs, avoiding where Dappu was held in the waist.

Gorotsuki 
The Gorotsuki (ゴロツキ Gorotsuki, "Rogue/Thug") are citizens of the Baribarian, the planet-like satellite where the Bowzock reside, they are chosen to find and fight the Carrangers, as the "monster of the week." for the series. When defeated, most of them eat imo-youkan, a yellow cube-shaped food made from jellied sweet potatoes to grow. It has to be from one store, Imocho, for this to happen, otherwise they shrink. As Grotch found out, out-of-date Imo-youkan from Imocho only enlarges the consumer for a short while until he reverts to original size. Gorotsuki had a habit of saying their names a lot, usually having them at the end of sentences.

 Reckless-Driving Fire Engine (暴走消防車 Bōsō Shōbōsha, 1): A fire truck turned into a monster by Gynamo. It was destroyed by the Carrangers when they used their weapons on it.
 BB Donpa (ビービードンパ BīBī Donpa, 2): Known as the "Beethoven of Outer Space", he is a loudspeaker-armored zombie-themed monster who is Bowzock's music conductor, able to blast sound waves from the horns on his wrists in his Donpa Beam, Donpa is sent by Gynamo to cause a racket loud enough for UFOs to blow the planet up for the Bowzock. Once on Earth, Donpa carries out the plan by making cars fly around in a musical number with their car horns on full blast. But when the Carrangers arrive to stop him, Donpa uses the cars to smash them until Dappu brings the Giga Formula to them. Using the Formula Weapons, the Carrangers drive off the Wumpers and Zelmonda before forming the Formula Nova to blast Donpa as he escapes on his bike. Though he survived, Donpa couldn't stop his horns from making a racket as a UFO arrives near the Baribarian and vaporizes him with only his arm remaining. He reappeared, slightly modified, in a dream Kyosuke had in episode 9.
 RR Rii (リーリーリー RīRī Rī, 3): Bowzock's best spiritualist, Rii is an engineer-themed monster who uses a massive hammer that he uses to "beat" guts into people, making them crazy and cause chaos. He goes to Earth, after being promised Zelmonda's job if he succeeds. But while going after Yoshie, Rii ends up striking a vacuum cleaner and decides to bring inanimate objects to life to attack people instead. When four of the Carrangers intervene, Rii gains forced aid from Zelmonda. After Rii changes Tenma's car, Red Racer finally joins the fight. After driving Zelmonda off, the Carrangers use the Formula Nova to kill RR Rii before he could use his hammer on a building, restoring everything in the process.
 MM Mogu (モーモーモグー MōMō Mogō, 4 & 5): A big-mouthed red-eyed tree frog-themed monster who is Bowzock's best eater, armed with a giant fork and knife. Grotch brought him along to find out which Earth food made Bowzock enlarge, using Ichitaro as a hostage for Souichirou to bring them the food Grotch ate earlier, including Imo-Youkan. However, he brought non-Imocho-brand Imo-youkan and Mogu shrank as he and Grotch ran away from the Tenma men. Mogu stayed this way for a week until he and Grotch made their way to Imocho, buying enough Imo-youkan to turn the tiny Mogu into a giant. Mogu was reluctant to attack, due to belly button lint, until Grotch talked the Gorotsuki into ignoring such a minor concern and go on an enlarged feeding frenzy. Mogu was the first to be killed by the RV Robo, as he was too busy eating to see the final attack coming. "Moguu-moguu" is the sound of chewing.
 QQ Kyuutan (キューキューキュータン KyūKyū Kyūtan, 6): Bowzock's best searcher, he is a Pharaoh/appraiser-themed monster who uses a staff with a magnifying glass as his weapon. He is hired by Gynamo to find a necklace that Zonnette wanted in the hopes of winning her affections. Using his camera eye to take a picture of the drawing Zonnette made and his super speed, Kyuutan proceeds to break into jewelry stores to find the necklace. Taking advantage of the heated debate between Pink Racer and Yellow Racer, Kyuutan runs off until he dodges the Formula Nova. He then eats the Imo-youkan Grotch handed him and grows big to continue his search before easily defeating RV Robo until the girls finally set aside their differences as Kyuutan notices the Rainbow Bridge and believes it to be the necklace he's looking for. In the end, he is killed by RV Robo.
 NN Nerenko (ネーネーネレンコ NēNē Nerenko, 7): Bowzock's best graffiti artist, he is a clown-themed monster who was hired to use Grotch's fattening spray to make objects explode, after becoming too fat. Though told to stay put while Grotch gets him Imo-youkan, Nerenko goes on a spraying rampage after seeing graffiti that brings his style to shame. He nearly kills four of the Carrangers with the fattening spray, until Blue Racer washes it off his teammates. In battle, he can also blast lasers from the face on his helmet, which is called using his Nerenko Beam attack. Destroyed by RV Robo.
 YY Bingo (ヤーヤービンゴ YāYā Bingo, 8): Bowzock's best racer, he is a demon-themed monster chases people down on his car, as Green Racer intercepts him in a high-speed race to the death. In battle, he could blast energy from the horn on his head. Quickly killed when Green Racer tricked him into crashing his car.
 YY Gonza (ヤーヤーゴンザ YāYā Gonza, 8): Bowzock's second, then becomes first, best racer and YY Bingo's demon-themed younger brother, possessing the same abilities as Bingo and much more. Arriving on Earth, Gonza visits Bingo's gravemarker before vowing to avenge him. Acquiring Green Racer's Axle Changer as a tail ring, Gonza goes to commit vehicular man slaughter to flush out Green Racer without knowledge that his quarry is unable to show up. With the other Carrangers unable to battle the racing fiend, Minoru arrives to fight Gonza as himself in a one-sided one-on-one fight. After Minoru is KOed, the Carrangers battle Gonza until Zelmonda and Grotch arrive to give him Imo-youkan. Once enlarged, Gonza overpowers the four Carrangers as Minoru regans his Axle Changer after it dropped off of him. After provoking Gonza to go after him, Green Racer knocks the giant down before RV Robo is formed and kills Gonza.
 LL Onene (レーレーオネネ RēRē Onene, 10): Bowzock's best biker gang leader, she rode on the tripped out bike, called Ryuuseigou, and uses a baton as her weapon, able to blast lasers from her shaded eyes. Going on her own seeing how soft and unmotivated the Bowzock were becoming, she uses her Bowzock headbands to draft Naoki and others into her bicycle gang. Pursuing Onene on their cart, the Carrangers are at a disadvantage as she uses narrow passages they can reach. Recruiting more members to her group, from preschool to high school, Natsumi takes matters in her hands by dismantling Naoki's bike before the learn the method to Onene's control. Taking advantage of the headband, Natsumi has Naoki work out his leg muscles so Naoki can catch up to Onene as they race each other. Once forced off her bike, the Carrangers battle the Wumpers as Blue Racer battles Onene and takes her out with his kicks. Eating Imo-youkan, Onene battles RV Robo and is easily killed off.
 PP Rappa (パーパーラッパー PāPā Rappā, 11): Bowzock's best scholar/calculator-themed monster mathemagician, he appears to play havoc with his staff to manipulate numbers like those in transfer check amounts and the price of items in stores. The Carrangers catch up to Rappa as he accidentally called Pink Racer heavy and escapes after she decked him in the nose. After being laughed at by his peers, Rappa vows vengeance as Grotch provides him a powerup backpack and the ability to use Number Bombs. Though he overpowers the four Carrangers on his own, an irate Yoko arrives, believing Rappa screwed up her scale with his magic and made her think she was fat, and revealing herself as Pink Racer as she gives him a beating of a lifetime. Eating Imo-youkan, Rappa battles RV Robo and is quickly killed off.
 UU Wurin (ウーウーウーリン ŪŪ Ūrin, 12 & 13): Bowzock's best traffic light destroyer, a feral snapping turtle-themed alien beast who could blast lasers from his eyes. He was conditioned by Grotch, under Gynamo's instructions, to eat Signalman. When Gynamo lures Signalman into a trap, they put him in chains so Wurin could finish him off. However, Signalman manages to beat him. Fed Imo-youkan by Grotch, Wurin grabs Signalman and is about to eat him, when the Carrangers arrive in RV Robo to save Signalman. This happened before they used the Gekisou Slice on him. Somehow, Wurin survived the attack and upgraded himself with a helmet, which caused spikes to extend from his body. Now Revived UU Wurin (再生ウーウーウーリン Saisei ŪŪ Uurin), he joins Zonnette in an attempt to drive a wedge between Signalman and the Carrangers. But seeing Pink Racer, Wurin becomes exposed, as a result of falling head over heels for her, chasing after her for a kiss. The others eventually arrived and used the Formula Nova to destroy him. Given twice the amount of Imo-youkan, Wurin keeps the Carrangers from summoning the Ranger Vehicles until Signalman arrives in the Sirender, laying the death penalty on the Gorotsuki.
 JJ Jetton (JJジェットトン JēJē Jetton, 16): A hippopotamus/punk-themed monster who is the best wrestler of Bowzock. Destroyed by RV Robo.
 ZZ Zeri (ゼーゼーゼリ ZēZē Zeri, 17): Bowzock's fashion designer, a very effeminante tropical fish-themed Gorotsuki who Ritchihiker uses in a scheme to have Signalman and the Carrangers destroy each other. Posing as a victim of Wumper abuse, Zeri manages to trick Signalman into putting on his rage-inducing "Anger Jacket" to have him under Ritchihiker's control with another made for Sirender when Signalman summons it. After Blue Racer and Green Racer destroy the remote while Red Racer removes the coat, Zeri enlarges to attack RV Robo by blasting patchwork shaped lasers from his eyes and electrified fabric samples s Sirender intervened as Zeri is then killed off by the combined teamwork of Sirender & RV Robo.
 OO Oopa (オーオーオーパ ŌŌ Ōpa, 18): Bowzock's yukata-wearing octopus-themed hot springs researcher, able to breathe fire and use bathhouse items as weapons. Oopa is sent by Ritchihiker to Rindo Lake Family Farm to take out the Carrangers with the Nuninini Beam Gun, which uses the energy from a Nuninuni Crystal to compel those hit to undress, so they could get colds. However, after Dappu is subjected to its effect, the Nuninuni gun is taken by a girl named Emi with Yellow Racer using it against him to defeat him. Once enlarged, Oopa uses his shampoo, bathhouse tubs, and geysers to fight RV Robo before being destroyed.
 HH Deeo (ヒューヒューデーオ HyūHyū Dēo, 19): Bowzock's best pitcher, Deeo is a baseball-themed monster sent by Ritchihiker to use his Pitch Bomb baseballs to destroy everything with Zonette using him as a means to get over her frustrations over Red Racer. However, as the other Carrangers hold Deeo off, Kyousuke masters the Invisible Swing to counter the Pitch Bomb. Enlarging as a last resort, Deeo gets destroyed by RV Robo.
 WW Waritcho (ワリワリワリッチョ WariWari Waritcho, 20): An Archaeopteryx-like alien who is Bowzock's best excavator with a jet pack and pickaxe, Waritcho is sent by Ritchihiker to find the asteroid holding Pegasus Thunder and Dragon Cruiser. However, the Gorotsuki frees the legendary vehicles by accident as he pursue them to Earth and captures Dragon Cruiser alongside Naoki. However, with Red Racer and Pegasus Cruiser save their friends as Waritcho is retrained by Dragon Cruiser to be blasted by Pegasus Thunder's Final Burning.
 AA Abanba (アーアーアバンバ ĀĀ Abanba, 21): Bowzock's best orangutan-themed shaman whose staff allows her to invisible, she is summoned by Gynamo as part of a plan to sacrifice the Carrangers after falling for Ritchihiker's notion that they need to appease a space demon responsible for the Bowzock's losing streak. Capturing the male Carrangers, Abanba straps them to a rocket before beginning the ritual. However, Natsumi and Yoko use the Carnavic to find their team mates while countering Abanba's invisibility. After being defeated with the Navi Blaster, Abanba enlarges and battles RV Robo and Sirender. After Sirender destroys her staff, Abanba is destroyed by RV Robo.
 CC Chakkoo (チャーチャーチャッコー ChāChā Chakkō, 22): Bowzock's best grasshopper-themed insect collector who uses electrified bug nets and fires energy eyeballs from his eyes. Chakkoo is used by Zelmonda to capture children in Japan, Ichitarou among them, as part of a scheme to convert them into new Bowzock members by planting them in Bowzock Pots and alter their DNA. When Signalman attempts to save Ichitaro, Chakko uses the officer's need to obey the rules against him. But the Carrangers arrive with Chakkoo enlarging in response, trapping RV Robo in a net before being destroyed by Sirender.
 VV Goriin (ヴゥーヴゥーゴリーン VūVū Gorīn, 23): Bowzock's best gold medalist, the Olympic torch-headed Goriin can use his medal to access weapons based on various Olympic events, ranging from Goriin Ribbon to Goriin Boxing gloves. He is sent after the Power Stone, a legendary gem, in a plan to destroy Earth by exposing it to Bowzock water. His search leads him to Princess Karen Dalen of the country of Bibalt with Naoki getting her to safety while attempting to take Goriin's medal. Once losing his medal to the Carrangers, Goriin is forced to enlarge as he dies fighting RV Robo.
 TT Terurin (テーテーテルリン TēTē Terurin, 24): Bowzock's best adding machine-themed tutor, the nerdy Terurin offers his help to the children in doing their summer homework for them in return for watermelons for a Bowzock melon splitting contest. However, what the children misunderstood he wanted how melons, Terurin decides to turns them into watermelon as payment for his services. But after Kyousuke and Minoru reconcile their differences, Terurin is defeated by Red Racer's Twincam Crash and then enlarges before being destroyed by RV Robo.
 DD Donmo (ドードードンモ, DōDō Donmo 26): Bowzock's best maniacal cell phone-themed shopper, he uses the cell phones on his wrists to order special weapons from the Intergalactic Telephone Shopping company which is delivered to him via rocket. Using the Skyscissors Shears he ordered, Dommo fights the Carrangers and uses Finisher Beam Repulser-An apron to deflect the Giga Formula. Despite a call delay and then RV Robo force deflecting the items back into the rockets, unable to order imo-youkan, Dommo succeeds in getting the Robo Slipper banana peel to get RV Robo on its back and then subjects it to personally initialed 100 grade bombs before ordering the Hero Sayonara Cannon to finish the Carrangers off. Luckily, having made a trip to Hokkaido to get his team new weapon after accidentally sending it there, Green Racer arrives with the Giga Booster which easily destroys Dommo and his weapon.
 XX Mileeno (クスクスミレーノ KusuKusu Mirēno, 27): Bowzock's best pizza chef, the Italian accented Gorotsuki who attempts to talk Gynamo into executing a plan to turn the Carrangers into a "Carranger Pizza". But as the Bowzock are too busy with the Bowzock Matsuri, Mileeno decides to act on his own. Making up a lie of law-breaking pizza to distract Signalman, Mileeno attacks the Carrangers before forcing Pegasus Thunder and Dragon Cruiser to get the heroes into a massive oven to bake them. After finally straightening out his own life and intentions, Signalman frees the Carrangers as they work together to defeat Mileeno. Afterwards, Mileeno ate an Imoyoukan pizza before being destroyed by Sirender & RV Robo.
 HH Wasshoishoi (ホイホイワッショイショイ HoiHoi Wasshoishoi, 28): Bowzock's best Mikoshi-themed festival coordinator, he is placed in charge of the Bowzock's Bowzock Matsuri with Ichitarou as this year's sacrifice at Mt. Sunatori. However, due to the Carrangers' intervention, Ritchihiker gets hit by the lightning as Signalman gets Ichitarou to safety. Furious that they ruined the festival, Wasshoishoi gets defeated by Signalman and eats Imoyoukan before coating RV Robo in a candy candy cocoon. Luckily, Sirender frees RV Robo and then destroys Wasshoishoi.
 ZZ Gyuuri (ヅケヅケギューリー ZukeZuke Gyūri, 32): Bowzock's biggest lover of kimchi. He piloted the RV Robo when it came under Bowzock control, with a row of explosives strapped to it. While VRV Robo & RV Robo battled, Red Racer managed to sneak inside the RV Robo, and in one of the best-remembered scenes in the show, fought Gyuuri on top of the waist-mounted explosives (halting RV Robo in the process). Red Racer managed to send the monster hurtling to the ground before shooting the bomb off and knocking it onto him. Gyuuri survived somehow and enlarged himself. Killed by VRV Robo.
 UU Ussu (ウスウスウッス UsuUsu Ussu, 33): A tiger/Strongman-themed Bowzock who drank Gekibaka (撃馬鹿 "Violent Idiot") drinks to become mindlessly powerful. He rode a motorcycle, which he also poured a Gekibaka drink into the gas tank. This caused the speed to increase and triggered a massive forest fire. In battle, he could breathe fire as well, though this was strengthened with the help of the drink. Killed by VRV Robo.
 FF Munchori (フィルフィルムンチョリ FiruFiru Munchori, 34): Bowzock's scandal photographer. He was sent by Zelmonda to see if Zonette was having an affair. At one point, he gave the Carrangers embarrassing photographs of themselves messing up. Was pummeled by RadiaCar Robo before being killed by VRV Robo.
 GG Boon (ゴンゴンボーン GonGon Bōn, 35): Bowzock's best coin purse-themed errand guy. When he first appeared, he was cutting a turn in front of Kyousuke when he was attempting to buy some boxed lunches for the others. Before they battled, unfortunately for him, he was hungry during that time too and couldn't put up much of a fight. This was also when SignalMan (who was drugged into being evil by the poisoned atmosphere of his planet) ambushed Kyosuke too. Killed by VRV Robo.
 BB Koiya (ブンブンコイヤ BunBun Koiya, 36): Bowzock's best gardener. His best attack is sowing seeds onto his opponents that wrapped them in vines. These vines would sprout flowers that would attract Space Bees that sting them to death. After almost all of the bees were destroyed, Koiya gave his remaining Space Bee a piece of his Imo-youkan, which he ate some of as well. While the bee was killed by Sirender, Koiya was killed by VRV Robo.
 PP Chiipuri (プリプリチープリ PuriPuri Chīpuri, 38): Bowzock's best make-up artist. He was used to make the owner of Imocho young again with youth cream supplied by Exhaus to allow for him to continue making the imo-youkan they needed for growth (since he was exhausted and was thinking of closing the shop due to his age). SignalMan was also affected by the youth cream and temporarily became a child. Chiipuri accidentally destroyed the Norishiron 12 by using the youth cream on it, turning it back into its original cardboard form. He ultimately was destroyed by VRV Robo.
 CC Patchoone (チャムチャムパッチョーネ ChamuChamu Patchōne, 39): Bowzock's best animal trainer. He was sent to gain back the Beager, an Earth dog-resembling alien that eats concrete used by Exhaus to destroy roads and highways throughout the universe by multiplying its numbers. However, the creature escaped and was ultimately adopted by Naoki, who protected it from its masters. Wielded an electrified whip and could shoot beams from his eyepiece, during battle. Killed by VRV Robo.
 OO Batton (オロオロバットン OroOro Batton, 40): A vampire bat-themed Gorotsuki Bowzock's best prankster that was sent to distract the Carrangers by pretending to be their friend, ultimately becoming friends with Minoru and joining in his celebrations of all things Osaka. However, his true intention was to lure the Carranger and their mech into a pit-trap set up by the Bowzock under the city to trap them and make them easily vulnerable for attack. He wielded a staff in battle with a hammer on one end and a drill on the other. After parts of both VRV Robo and RV Robo were damaged by Batton (VRV Robo's torso and RV Robo's limbs), Minoru ultimately mixed and matched the remaining mechs into Scramble Intersection Robo, which ultimately destroyed Batton after not heeding to Minoru's final pleas of friendship.
 SS Sutatanzo (スタスタスタタンゾ SutaSuta Sutatanzo, Carranger vs. Ohranger): Bowzock's best gas attendant, he was sent to use the three tanks of gasoline Exhaus gave the Bowzock to make cars fly. He could breathe fire. His actions end up sending Gorou(OhRed) into space when the gas is placed within his Red Jetter, making him fly into the sky leading to him becoming captured by the Bowzock. Killed by VRV Robo.
 MM Shuurisukii (メチャメチャシューリスキー MechaMecha Shūrisukī, 44): Bowzock's best auto mechanic, who was looking for a magical wrench that could make the ultimate modifications to any object, which turned out to be owned by Natsumi. He managed to steal it, turn it wretched, and used it to adapt the vehicle it was using into the ultimate battle weapon for Exhaus, with it. Yellow Racer eventually gained back the wrench and destroyed the battle vehicle. Killed by VRV Robo.
 EE Musubinofu (エンエンムスビノフ EnEn Musubinofu, 45): Bowzock's best love letter-themed marriage master. Used by Zelmonda to cheer up his friend, Gynamo by suggestion of Exhaus. His plan was to use this alien to force Zonette into marrying Gynamo through some sort of legality, to the point that the duo together would finally blow up Earth as a honeymoon present. He could shoot arrows with a photograph in the middle, and whatever he hit (living or otherwise) fell in love with the subject of the picture. Kyousuke faced him down in combat without transforming to prove his love to Zonnette, stabbing him with a sword prior to its growth, where it is killed by a combination of Radietta's Radicar and four of VRV Fighters (minus Fire Fighter) with the Victory Twister attack.

Others 
 Elekinta (エレキンタ Erekinta, 14): A legendary space biker who bestows power to whoever can break the speed limit. Though Zelmoda was fearful at first, he overcomes his fear of lightning to summon Elekinta who upgrades his biker so they can use team attacks. Luckily, Green Racer ultimately stops both Elektina and Zemolda after eating grilled unagi to overcome his own fear. After enlarging himself with the electric current of both bikes, Elekinta is destroyed killed by RV Robo and Sirender.
 Ballinger Z (バリンガーZ Baringā Zetto): This grenade-themed monster never appeared in the series, but it was seen in promotional pictures fighting the VRV Fighters. It wasn't used in the show due to legal problems with Dynamic Productions. Also, it bears a similarity to Mazinger Z, hence the suit from Dynamic Productions.
 Helmedor (ヘルメドー Herumedō, Megaranger vs. Carranger): An biker alien wanted to build a motorcycle racing ramp thought the Milky Way, a scheme similar to Exhaus. He used Picot to grant his wish for a planet destroying laser cannon which he used to destroy the planet Jail, the prison planet where he was locked up for 200 years. He was eventually taken under Shibolena control via her magic kiss. Killed by RV Robo.

Episodes

V-Cinema releases
 Gekisou Sentai Carranger Super Video
 Gekisou Sentai Carranger vs. Ohranger (Takes place between Episodes 38 and 39 of Gekisou Sentai Carranger)
 Denji Sentai Megaranger vs. Carranger (Takes place between Episodes 39 and 40 of Denji Sentai Megaranger)

Cast
 : 
 : 
 : 
 : 
 : 
 : 
 : 
 : 
 : 
 : , 
 : 
 : 
 : 
 : 
 : 
 : 
 : →
 : 
 : 
 : 
 : 
 : 
 :

Songs
Opening themes

Lyrics: 
Composition & Arrangement: 
Artist: 
Episodes: 1–13 & 48 (End Credits)

Lyrics: Yukinojō Mori
Composition: Takashi Shōji
Arrangement: Keiichi Oku
Artist: Naritaka Takayama
Episodes: 14–48

Ending theme

Lyrics: Yukinojō Mori
Composition & Arrangement: Takashi Shōji
Artist: Naritaka Takayama

International Broadcasts and Home Video
In Indonesia, the series aired with an Indonesian dub on RCTI.
In Thailand, the series aired on Channel 9 with a Thai dub, produced by Na Toi Se and aired in 2000, a year after Power Rangers Turbo was also aired. Various distributors released the series on home video (specifically VCD and DVD), while the same dub was carried over.
In North America, the series would receive a DVD release by Shout! Factory on April 25, 2017 in the original Japanese audio with English subtitles. It is the fifth Super Sentai series to be officially released in the region.

Video game
A platform game based on the series called Gekisō Sentai Carranger: Zenkai! Racer Senshi was produced for the Sufami Turbo, an add-on for the Super Famicom.

Notes

External links

 Official Gekisou Sentai Carranger website 
 Official Shout! Factory page
 Official Shout Factory TV page

..

Super Sentai
Fictional cars
1996 Japanese television series debuts
1997 Japanese television series endings
Television series about alien visitations
Japanese action television series
Japanese fantasy television series
Japanese science fiction television series
1990s Japanese television series
Works about cars